Chicago XXXIII: O Christmas Three is the twenty-second studio album, the second full album of Christmas songs, and thirty-third overall by the American rock band, Chicago. The album was released on October 4, 2011. The collection includes a variety of holiday classics and a new tune, "Rockin' and Rollin' on Christmas Day", co-written by founding trumpet player Lee Loughnane.

The album was produced by veteran producer Phil Ramone, who co-produced the band's albums Hot Streets (1978) and Chicago 13 (1979). The album features guest artists Dolly Parton on Paul McCartney's "Wonderful Christmas Time", America on "I Saw Three Ships", BeBe Winans on "Merry Christmas Darling", and guitarist Steve Cropper on "Rockin’ and Rollin’ on Christmas Day".

Chicago XXXIII: O Christmas Three was preceded by Chicago XXV: The Christmas Album in 1998, which, itself, was reissued in 1999 with one new track; and in 2003 under a new title, What's It Gonna Be, Santa? with six new tracks.

Track listing

Personnel 

Chicago
 Robert Lamm – keyboards, vocals, arrangements (3, 8, 11), horn arrangement (8, 11)
 Lee Loughnane – trumpets, vocals, arrangements (6, 10), horn arrangement (10)
 James Pankow – trombone, horn arrangement (1, 2, 4-7, 9, 12, 14), arrangements (7, 14)
 Walter Parazaider – saxophones, flute
 Jason Scheff – bass, vocals, arrangements (1, 5, 12)
 Tris Imboden – drums, arrangements (12)
 Keith Howland – guitars, vocals, arrangements (2, 12)
 Lou Pardini – keyboards, vocals, arrangements (4, 7, 13)
 Drew Hester – percussion

Additional personnel
 America (Gerry Beckley and Dewey Bunnell) – vocals, ukuleles, guitars and vocal arrangement ("I Saw Three Ships")
 Hank Linderman – cuatro ("I Saw Three Ships")
 Dolly Parton – vocals ("Wonderful Christmas Time")
 Bebe Winans – vocals ("Merry Christmas Darling")
 Steve Cropper – guitar ("Rockin’ And Rollin’ On Christmas Day")
 Children's Choir: Grace Howland, Hope Howland, Lydia Young, Jillian DeGrie, Lilli Pankow, Carter Pankow, Connor Scheff, Jason Scheff Jr. – vocals ("Here Comes Santa Claus"/"Joy To The World")

Production
 Produced by Phil Ramone
 Management – Peter Schivarelli
 Recorded by Matt Coles and Adam Deane at The Sound Kitchen (Franklin, TN).
 Pre-Mix Crew – Drew Hester and Keith Smith
 Mixed by B.J. Ramone at Morrisound Studios (Tampa, FL) and Shire Studios (CT).
 Art Direction – Bobby Woods

References

Sources
Chicago Records II (Chicago XXXIII: O Christmas Three)
AllMusic: http://www.allmusic.com/album/o-christmas-three-r2324365

Chicago (band) albums
Albums produced by Phil Ramone
2011 Christmas albums
Christmas albums by American artists
Rock Christmas albums